Zimbabwe competed at the 2012 Summer Olympics in London, UK from 27 July to 12 August 2012. This was the nation's ninth consecutive appearance at the Olympics, after gaining its independence from the former Rhodesia.

The Zimbabwe Olympic Committee (ZOC) sent the nation's smallest delegation to the Games. A total of seven athletes, four men and three women, competed in four different sports. Swimmer and defending Olympic champion Kirsty Coventry was Zimbabwe's greatest highlight to the Games, and the most successful athlete in Olympic history. She won a total of seven Olympic medals (two gold, four silver, and one bronze) in both backstroke and individual medley events, and broke both an Olympic and a world record. Because of her repeated successes in swimming, Coventry became the nation's first female flag bearer at the opening ceremony. On 11 August 2012, Coventry was elected to the IOC Athletes' Commission, along with three other athletes.

Zimbabwe, however, failed to win a single Olympic medal for the first time since 2000, following Coventry's sixth-place finishes in two of her sporting events. Meanwhile, long-distance runner Cuthbert Nyasango also missed out of the medal standings, after finishing seventh in the men's marathon.

Athletics

Zimbabwean athletes achieved qualifying standards in the following athletics events (up to a maximum of 3 athletes in each event at the 'A' Standard, and 1 at the 'B' Standard):

Key
 Note – Ranks given for track events are within the athlete's heat only
 Q = Qualified for the next round
 q = Qualified for the next round as a fastest loser or, in field events, by position without achieving the qualifying target
 NR = National record
 N/A = Round not applicable for the event
 Bye = Athlete not required to compete in round

Men

Women

Rowing

Zimbabwe qualified two boats.

Men

Women

Qualification Legend: FA=Final A (medal); FB=Final B (non-medal); FC=Final C (non-medal); FD=Final D (non-medal); FE=Final E (non-medal); FF=Final F (non-medal); SA/B=Semifinals A/B; SC/D=Semifinals C/D; SE/F=Semifinals E/F; Q=Quarterfinals; R=Repechage

Swimming

Zimbabwean swimmers achieved qualifying standards in the following events (up to a maximum of 2 swimmers in each event at the Olympic Qualifying Time (OQT), and potentially 1 at the Olympic Selection Time (OST)):

Women

Triathlon

Zimbabwe has qualified the following athletes.

References

External links

Nations at the 2012 Summer Olympics
2012
2012 in Zimbabwean sport